The 2021 Wrocław Panthers season was  the first season of the Wrocław Panthers team in the European League of Football, after moving over from the Polish league LFA.

Regular season

Standings

Schedule

Source: europeanleague.football

Roster

Notes

References 

Panthers Wrocław
Panthers Wrocław
Panthers Wrocław